Lalruatdika (born 12 September 1996) is an Indian cricketer. He made his List A debut on 8 October 2018, for Mizoram in the 2019–20 Vijay Hazare Trophy. He made his first-class debut on 3 January 2020, for Mizoram in the 2019–20 Ranji Trophy.

References

External links
 

1996 births
Living people
Indian cricketers
Mizoram cricketers